"The Shot" refers to a play by Valparaiso University's Crusaders that occurred in the first round of the 1998 NCAA Tournament. The play came in Valpo's game against the University of Mississippi Rebels at The Myriad in Oklahoma City on March 13, 1998, and gave the #13 seed Crusaders a 70–69 victory over #4 seed Ole Miss. The game was part of a Valparaiso Cinderella run in the tournament that ended in the Sweet Sixteen when the Crusaders lost to Rhode Island.

Buildup

Although Ole Miss was a much higher seed than Valparaiso and was expected to win easily and advance to the second round, the Crusaders played tough throughout and were down 69–67 with less than ten seconds left. Bryce Drew, Valpo's star guard and son of coach Homer Drew, missed a three-pointer with approximately five seconds left, and after Mississippi grabbed the rebound Valparaiso fouled Ole Miss' Ansu Sesay to stop the clock and send the 74% free-throw shooter to the line.

Although Sesay had made three of his last five attempts at the charity stripe, he missed the first of two. Coach Drew then called his last time out before Sesay could take his second free throw, in order to draw up a play for the Crusaders' last possession. When play resumed Sesay missed his second free throw, and following a battle for the loose ball Valparaiso was awarded possession after Ole Miss guard Keith Carter knocked the ball out of bounds. This left Valpo with 2.5 seconds to get off a shot, and forced inbounder Jaime Sykes to put the ball in play from the far end of the court.

The play

The Crusaders' play for this situation was known as "Pacer". Sykes threw the inbounds pass over the midcourt line, where Bill Jenkins outjumped a Rebel defender for the ball and immediately tapped it over to a running Drew, who shot a 23-foot 3-point shot. Drew's defender had been left flat-footed as he considered defending Sykes, leaving Drew open as he began streaking.  The ball went in as time expired, giving Valpo a 70–69 win and eliminating Ole Miss from the tournament.

The Call

Veteran broadcaster Ted Robinson had the game-winning call on CBS:

Valparaiso announcer Todd Ickow was courtside for the radio broadcast, almost directly behind Drew on press row as he made the call:

Legacy
In 2003, ESPN Classic ranked Valparaiso's 1998 run as #3 on its "Classic Cinderellas" list, with "The Shot" as a large part of the reason why it ranked as high as it did.

In 2007, "The Shot" was named the fifth most memorable moment in CBS's coverage of the NCAA tournament by sports analyst Gary Parrish.

Parody

"The Shot" was parodied during the 2013 NCAA Tournament with an Axe Apollo Body Spray commercial by placing a fictitious Astronaut on the Valparaiso sideline that garnered more attention than Drew's shot.

References

External links
 

1997–98 NCAA Division I men's basketball season
College basketball games in the United States
Ole Miss Rebels men's basketball
Valparaiso Beacons men's basketball
March 1998 sports events in the United States
1998 in sports in Oklahoma